Conasprella hopwoodi is a species of sea snail, a marine gastropod mollusk in the family Conidae, the cone snails and their allies.

Like all species within the genus Conasprella, these cone snails are predatory and venomous. They are capable of "stinging" humans, therefore live ones should be handled carefully or not at all.

Description
The size of the shell varies between 25 mm and 32 mm.

Distribution
This marine species occurs in Melanesia, Vanuatu, the South China Sea and off Papua New Guinea, Solomon Islands and off Queensland, Australia

References

 Sowerby, G.B.(3rd) 1875. Descriptions of ten new species of shells. Proceedings of the Zoological Society of London 1875: 125–129
 Tomlin, J.R. le B. 1936. Conus gracilis G.B. Sowerby III. Journal of Conchology 20(8): 254
 Röckel, D., Korn, W. & Kohn, A.J. 1995. Manual of the Living Conidae. Volume 1: Indo-Pacific Region. Wiesbaden : Hemmen 517 pp.
  Puillandre N., Duda T.F., Meyer C., Olivera B.M. & Bouchet P. (2015). One, four or 100 genera? A new classification of the cone snails. Journal of Molluscan Studies. 81: 1–23

External links
 The Conus Biodiversity website
 Cone Shells – Knights of the Sea
 
 Specimen at MNHN, Paris

hopwoodi
Gastropods described in 1937